WIJV is a commercial Contemporary Christian radio station broadcasting on 92.7MHz in the Harriman, Tennessee area.

WIJV is owned by Progressive Media and broadcasts Salem Communications Contemporary Christian programming. The station was originally known as 92.7 The Breeze and broadcast Adult Contemporary music.

External links

Progressive Media

IJV
IJV